Leland Palmer (born June 16, 1941, in Port Washington, New York) is an American actress, dancer, and singer who has appeared on stage, in motion pictures, and on television. She appeared on Broadway in Bajour (1964), A Joyful Noise (1966) Hello, Dolly! (1967 replacement Minnie Fay), Applause (1970 replacement), and Pippin (1972). Palmer received two Tony Award nominations: in 1967 for featured actress in a musical (Miss Jimmie in A Joyful Noise), and in 1973 for actress in a musical (Fastrada in Pippin).

Career
Palmer appeared as Viola in the rock musical Your Own Thing during a highly regarded run at the Huntington Hartford Theater in Los Angeles in August 1968, in the role that she originated in the original Off-Broadway production in 1968. She appeared in Dames at Sea which opened in September 1970 at the theater at Plaza 9 in New York City. She played the role of Ruby, with The New York Times reviewer writing: "Ruby... is played like a virtuous, squeaking mouse by a girl named Leland Palmer, who is delicious in a mildly frightening way." She appeared in the musical Double Feature at the Long Wharf Theatre, New Haven, Connecticut, which opened in November 1979. The show had music by Jeff Moss and was directed by Mike Nichols.

Her U.S. television appearances include guest roles on Love, American Style; Laverne & Shirley; and Rhoda. She was also a regular on Dinah Shore's summer variety television show, Dinah and Her New Best Friends in 1976.  She played Aŕlene in the 1976 NBC television movie James Dean. Palmer is known for Bob Fosse's All That Jazz (1979), in which she played Audrey Paris, a character believed to be modeled on Fosse's wife, Gwen Verdon.

Palmer is known now as Linda Posner. She was born Linda Palmer, and discovered many years later that the family name was really "Posner." Although she no longer performs, she works with theaters in California. She taught acting classes at Mendocino Community College and was the artistic director, Director, Teacher, and Consultant for the Willits Community Theater (Willits, California). Pearl Marill, Posner's daughter who heads a dance company, presented a one-time event "My Mother on Broadway" in October 2014 in San Francisco. She served as choreographer of the 42nd Street Moon, San Francisco production of Irma La Douce in 2008.

Trivia
The 1990-1991 U.S. television series Twin Peaks and its 2017 continuation featured a fictional, male character named Leland Palmer who was played by Ray Wise.

Actress Leland Palmer was a featured character, played by Lindsay Nicole Chambers, in the FX Series Fosse/Verdon.

Filmography

References

External links
 
 

1945 births
Living people
Actresses from New York (state)
American choreographers
American female dancers
Dancers from New York (state)
American women singers
American film actresses
American musical theatre actresses
American television actresses
People from Port Washington, New York
21st-century American women